Eleanor of Austria (15 November 1498 – 25 February 1558), also called Eleanor of Castile, was born an Archduchess of Austria and Infanta of Castile from the House of Habsburg, and subsequently became Queen consort of Portugal (1518–1521) and of France (1530–1547). She also held the Duchy of Touraine (1547–1558) in dower. She is called "Leonor" in Spanish and Portuguese and "Eléonore" or "Aliénor" in French.

Life

Eleanor was born in 1498 at Leuven, the eldest child of Philip the Handsome and Joanna of Castile, who would later become co-sovereigns of Castile. Her father was also the son of the reigning Holy Roman Emperor Maximilian I and his deceased consort Mary of Burgundy, while her mother was the daughter of the Catholic monarchs; namely Ferdinand of Aragon and Isabella of Castile. Her siblings were Holy Roman Emperor Charles V, Holy Roman Emperor Ferdinand I, Queen Isabella of Denmark, Queen Mary of Hungary, and Queen Catherine of Portugal. She was named after her paternal great-grandmother, Eleanor of Portugal, Holy Roman Empress. After the death of her father in September 1506 Eleanor was educated at her aunt's court in Mechelen.

When she was a child, Eleanor's relatives tried to marry her to the future King of England, Henry VIII, to whom she was betrothed. However, when Henry's father died and he became King, Henry decided to marry Eleanor's aunt, Catherine of Aragon, who was the widow of King Henry's older brother, Arthur, Prince of Wales. Her relatives also tried to marry her to the French kings Louis XII or Francis I, or to the Polish King Sigismund I, but nothing came of these plans. Eleanor was also proposed as a marriage candidate for Antoine, Duke of Lorraine, in 1510.

In 1517 Eleanor may have had a love affair with Frederick II, Elector Palatine. Her brother King Charles, who had succeeded their elderly grandfather King Ferdinand as King of Spain the year before, once discovered her reading a love letter from Frederick. Charles forced Eleanor and Frederick to swear in front of an attorney that they were not secretly married, after which he expelled Frederick from court. She followed her brother to Spain in 1517.

Queen of Portugal 

Eleanor married her uncle by marriage, King Manuel I of Portugal, after a proposed marriage with her cousin, the future King John III of Portugal, did not occur. Her brother Charles arranged the marriage between Eleanor and the King of Portugal to avoid the possibility of Portuguese assistance for any rebellion in Castile. Manuel had previously been married to two of Eleanor's maternal aunts, Isabella of Aragon and Maria of Aragon.

Manuel and Eleanor married on 16 July 1518. They had two children: the Infante Charles (born 18 February 1520 – died 15 April 1521) and the Infanta Maria (born 8 June 1521, and who was later one of the richest princesses of Europe). She became a widow on 13 December 1521, when Manuel died of the plague. As Queen Dowager of Portugal, Eleanor returned to the court of Charles in Spain. Eleanor's sister Catherine later married Eleanor's stepson, King John III of Portugal.

In July 1523, Eleanor was engaged to Charles III, Duke of Bourbon, in an alliance between Charles and Bourbon against France, but the marriage never took place. In 1526, Eleanor was engaged to King Francis I of France during his captivity in Spain.

Queen of France 

The Treaty of Cambrai (1529; called La Paz de las Damas - "The Ladies' Peace") paused the conflict between Francis and Charles. It included the stipulation that the previously agreed upon marriage of Eleanor and Francis would take place.

Eleanor left Spain in the company of her future stepsons, who had been held hostage by her brother. The group met Francis at the border, and then departed for an official entrance to Bordeaux. She was married to Francis on 4 July 1530. Eleanor was crowned Queen of France in Saint-Denis on 31 May 1531. She was dressed in purple velvet at her coronation. They had no children.

Eleanor was ignored by Francis, who seldom performed his marital obligations and preferred his lover Anne de Pisseleu d'Heilly. At the official entrance of Eleanor to Paris, Francis displayed himself openly to the public in a window with Anne for two hours.

Queen Eleanor performed as the queen of France at official occasions, such as the wedding between her stepson Henry and Catherine de' Medici in 1533. She also performed charity and was praised for this. She also took her stepdaughters, Madeleine and Margaret, into her household to raise them further.

As queen, Eleanor had no political power; however, she served as a contact between France and Emperor Charles. Queen Eleanor was present at the peace negotiations between Francis and Charles in Aigues-Mortes in 1538. In 1544, she was given the task of entering peace negotiations with Charles and their sister Mary of Hungary. In November 1544, she visited Charles in Brussels.

Later life
As a queen dowager, Eleanor left France for Brussels in 1548. She witnessed the abdication of Charles in October 1555 and left for Spain with him and their sister Mary in August 1556. She lived with her sister in Jarandilla de la Vera, where they often visited their brother, who retired to a monastery nearby. In 1558, she met her daughter Maria in Badajoz for the first time in 28 years. Eleanor died in 1558 on the return trip from Badajoz.

Family
With Manuel I of Portugal:
 Infante Charles (born 18 February 1520 – died 15 April 1521); died in infancy.
 Maria of Portugal, Duchess of Viseu (born 8 June 1521 – died 10 October 1577); never married and did not have issue.

Ancestry

References

External links

|-

|-

1498 births
1558 deaths
French queens consort
Portuguese queens consort
Austrian princesses
Austrian Roman Catholics
Spanish infantas
Aragonese infantas
Castilian infantas
16th-century House of Habsburg
House of Valois
Burials in the Pantheon of Infantes at El Escorial
Francis I of France
16th-century Spanish people
16th-century Portuguese people
16th-century French people
15th-century French women
15th-century French people
16th-century French women
15th-century Portuguese women
16th-century Portuguese women
15th-century Spanish women
Remarried royal consorts
Spanish people of Austrian descent
Daughters of kings
Dukes of Touraine